Pope Clement III (r. 1187–91) created 30 cardinals in three consistories held during his pontificate; this included the elevation of his future successor Pope Innocent III in 1190.

12 March 1188
 Gérard Mainard O.Cist.
 Pietro
 Alessio
 Giordano di Ceccano O.Cist.
 Pietro
 Pietro
 Giovanni Malabranca
 Gregorio de San Apostolo
 Giovanni Felici
 Bernardo Can. Reg.
 Gregorio Crescenzi

May 1189
 Giovanni
 Alessandro
 Giovanni

September 1190
 Pietro Gallozia
 Rufino
 Rinaldo O.S.B.
 Guy Paré O.Cist.
 Cencio
 Ugo
 Giovanni di Salerno O.S.B. Cas.
 Romano
 Egidio di Anagni
 Gregorio Carelli
 Lotario dei Conti di Segni
 Gregorio
 Niccolò
 Guido de Papa
 Giovanni Barrata
 Niccolò

Notes and references

Sources

College of Cardinals
Clement III
12th-century cardinals
12th-century Catholicism